The Croatian Water Polo Cup is a national cup of water polo in Croatia. It is organized by the Croatian Water Polo Federation.

Title holders 

 1992–93  Mladost
 1993–94  Mladost
 1994–95  Jug
 1995–96  Primorje
 1996–97  Jug
 1997–98  Mladost
 1998–99  Mladost
 1999–00  POŠK
 2000–01  Jug
 2001–02  Mladost
 2002–03  Jug
 2003–04  Jug
 2004–05  Jug
 2005–06  Mladost
 2006–07  Jug
 2007–08  Jug
 2008–09  Jug
 2009–10  Jug
 2010–11  Mladost
 2011–12  Mladost
 2012–13  Primorje
 2013–14  Primorje
 2014–15  Primorje
 2015–16  Jug
 2016–17  Jug
 2017–18  Jug
 2018–19  Jug
 2019–20  Mladost
 2020–21  Mladost
 2021–22 Jadran

Results

Results by club

See also
Croatian First League of Water Polo

3